Thomas Power may refer to:
Thomas C. Power (1839–1923), American politician
Thomas S. Power (1905–1970), U.S. Air Force general
Thomas "Ta" Power (died 1987), Irish nationalist
Thomas Joseph Power (1830–1893), Roman Catholic priest and bishop of St. John's, Newfoundland
Thomas Power (Newfoundland politician) (1886–1959), Newfoundland merchant and politician
Thomas Power (Australian politician) (1802–1873), auctioneer, pastoral agent and politician in colonial Victoria, Australia
Thomas G. Power (born 1950), judge and member of the Michigan House of Representatives
Tom Power (1869–1898), American baseball player
Tom Power (musician) (born 1987), Canadian musician and broadcaster

See also
Thomas Power O'Connor, Irish nationalist
Thomas Powers (disambiguation)